The Blackburn T.3 Velos was a 1920s British two-seat coastal defence seaplane built by Blackburn Aeroplane & Motor Company Limited, Brough Aerodrome and the Greek National Aircraft Factory.

Design and development
The basic design of the Blackburn Dart was developed into a two-seater to meet a Greek Navy requirement for a coastal defence seaplane. The aircraft became the T.3 Velos, a twin-float seaplane. The Velos differed from the standard Dart T.2 in having a two-seat cockpit with a rear-mounted .303 in (7.7 mm) Lewis Gun, an increased weapons load with four 230 lb (104 kg) bombs mounted under the wings and provisions to fly as either a seaplane with floats or with a conventional undercarriage.

In 1925, a small batch of four aircraft was built at Brough Aerodrome for the Greek Navy. Later in the same year, the aircraft was chosen to be the first licence-built aircraft in Greece, in a factory built by Blackburn and operated under a five-year contract. The Aircraft Factory, later renamed the State Aircraft Factory or Greek National Aircraft Factory, operated in Palaion Faliro to produce 12 Greek-built T.3A Velos aircraft with a raised rear cockpit to give an improved field of fire for the observer and a larger radiator. The first of the production order flew in March 1926.

Blackburn produced two additional T.3 models as the T.3A Velos, initially for trials of the company's new metal floats and later, one example embarked on a demonstration and sales tour of South America in 1927. Despite the  sales tour, the T.3A garnered no orders. Both T.3As were converted to seaplane trainers and joined four other production aircraft built for the Blackburn Reserve School (North Sea Aerial and General Transport Co. Ltd) to replace the company's Dart seaplane trainers for providing advanced training. After 1929, all of the T.3As were converted back into landplanes and continued in service until replacement by Ripons and Baffins in 1933.

Operational service
The Blackburn T.3 Velos not only fulfilled an operational role as a coastal defence/torpedo bomber in the Naval Air Component Squadrons in Greece, but also helped establish an indigenous aviation industry. The aircraft began operations in 1926 with the Greek Navy deployed at Tatoi Aerodrome and Phaleron Bay, Athens. During operations, the T.3s delivered steady if not spectacular service. The Velos remained in squadron use until 1934 with all examples retired by 1936.

Operators

Civil operators

North Sea Aerial and General Transport Company Limited

Military operators

Hellenic Air Force
Hellenic Navy

Specifications (T.3A Velos Landplane)

See also

Notes

References
 The Illustrated Encyclopedia of Aircraft (Part Work 1982-1985). London: Orbis Publishing.
 Jackson, A.J. Blackburn Aircraft since 1909. London:Putnam, 1968. .
 Jackson, A.J. British Civil Aircraft Since 1919, Volume 1. London: Putnam, 1974. .
 Taylor, Michael, J.H. (ed.) Jane's Encyclopedia of Aviation. Danbury, Connecticut: Grolier Educational Corporation, 1980. .
 Thomas, Andrew. "In the Footsteps of Daedulus: Early Greek Naval Aviation". Air Enthusiast, No. 94, July–August 2001, pp. 8–9.

External links

 A history of Greek military equipment (1821-today): Blackburn Velos
 The Royal Air force in the 1930s

1920s British patrol aircraft
Floatplanes
Velos
Single-engined tractor aircraft
Biplanes
Aircraft first flown in 1925